Abacetus lecordieri is a species of ground beetle in the subfamily Pterostichinae. It was described by Straneo in 1969.

References

lecordieri
Beetles described in 1969